The 2021 Europe's Strongest Man was a strongman competition that took place in Leeds, England on 4 September 2021 at the First Direct Arena. This event was part of the 2021 Giants live tour.

Results of events

Event 1: Max Log Lift

Event 2: Shield Carry
Weight:  for longest distance possible.

^ Adam Bishop sustained an injury in this event and took no further part in the competition.

Event 3: Deadlift
Weight:  for as many repetitions as possible.
Time Limit: 60 seconds
Notes: This event was completed on an axle bar.

Event 4: Car Walk
Weight:  
Course Length:  

^ Gavin Bilton sustained an injury in this event and took no further part in the competition.

Event 5: Atlas Stones

Final Results

References

External links 

Competitions in the United Kingdom
Europe's Strongest Man